is a railway station on the Osaka Metro Sennichimae Line in Fukushima-ku, Osaka, Japan. The station is assigned the station number S12.

Connecting line
 Osaka Loop Line

Layout
There are two side platforms with two tracks.  Ticket gates are locate on upper level than platforms in the south of the station and same level as platforms in the north on each, thus, there are three ticket gates in total.

Surroundings

Fukushima-ku, Osaka
Railway stations in Osaka
Railway stations in Japan opened in 1969
Osaka Metro stations